Władysław Raginis  (June 27, 1908 – September 10, 1939) was a Polish military commander during the Polish Defensive War of 1939 of a small force holding the Polish fortified defense positions against a vastly larger invasion during the Battle of Wizna. Because the positions were held at great cost for three days before being annihilated with few survivors, Wizna is referred to as the Polish Thermopylae and Captain Raginis as a modern Leonidas.

Background
Raginis was born in Zariņi (Zariny) village near to Dźwińsk (Daugavpils), Courland Governorate, Russian Empire (present-day Latvia) to a landowning family with patriotic traditions. Soon after graduating from a gymnasium in 1927, he joined the Infantry NCO School in Komorowo near Ostrów Mazowiecka where he was a mediocre student and completed his studies in 1928. He then completed a short practice of the military and the same year he enrolled at the Infantry Officers School in Ostrów Mazowiecka. One of his schoolmates recalled: "He had a borderland accent, and was quiet and shy. Slim, small, blond hair .... " After graduating on July 15, 1930, he was assigned to the 76th Infantry Regiment stationed in Grodno, where he was a platoon commander and instructor-lecturer at the School Cadet Corps. In 1939, as a distinction, he was advanced to lieutenant and then to captain and assigned to the elite Border Defence Corps (KOP) as the commander of the 3rd company, heavy machine gun battalion,  of the Border Defence Corps Regiment "Sarny" under the command of Lt-Colonel Nikodem Sulik.

In the late summer of 1939, the "Sarny" Regiment sent the bulk of its forces to Upper Silesia to man the Fortified Area Silesia, some units, including Raginis, instead went to Osowiec Fortress, near the border with East Prussia.

"Wizna" secured a major artery of communication, the Łomża – Białystok road and the Zambrów – Osowiec railway.

It is worth noting that some of the shelters were incomplete as war broke out, some had little to no ventilation, many of them not camouflaged and some were not fitted with armored observation domes. The incomplete state of the shelters significantly reduced the combat capability of the emplacements.

The battle of Wizna 
On September 7 Raginis' forces (approximately 720 men, out of which roughly 650 were killed) were attacked by more than 42,000 German soldiers. To keep the morale of his men high, Raginis pledged that he would not leave his post alive.

The defense of Wizna against overwhelming odds lasted for three days. On September 10, 1939, the bunker commanded by Raginis was the last remaining pocket of resistance. Although heavily wounded, Raginis was still commanding his troops. At noon on the third day, the German commander, Heinz Guderian, threatened that all Polish POWs would be shot if the defense of the bunker did not cease. Turning to his men in the shelter, Raginis thanked them for their bravery, and for doing their duty. He then ordered them to surrender and leave the shelter - he would keep his word and not surrender. Seweryn Biegański, who was the last to leave the shelter, describes the moment; 
"The captain looked at me warmly and softly urged me to leave. When I was at the exit, I was hit on my back with strong gust and I heard an explosion."

Raginis decided to end the resistance and committed suicide by throwing himself on a grenade.

In his diaries, Guderian noted that 900 German soldiers were killed in action, although that number is probably a low estimate. It is certain, however, that the Wehrmacht lost at least 10 tanks and several other AFVs in the struggle.

The defense of Wizna, despite the clear imbalance of forces, of which the defenders were aware, was significant. It had pinned down the German forces for two days, allowing the remnants of Polish troops in western Poland to defend the capital, Warsaw. It helped gain time for many Polish units and the government leadership to conduct an orderly withdrawal to the Romanian bridgehead.

The Germans agreed to allow burial of the corpses of Raginis and Lieutenant Stanisław Brykalski by Kazimierz Puchowicz, a friend of Raginis, next to the bunker where a tree was planted as an impromptu memorial. When the Red Army entered Wizna, the Soviet authorities ordered the bodies to be dug up and moved next to the Łomża - Białystok road, where an obelisk stands today. His symbolic grave is located next to the ruins of the bunker in which he died.

The inscription on the monument tablet says; 
Przechodniu, powiedz Ojczyźnie, żeśmy walczyli do końca, spełniając swój obowiązek which translates into English as: Passerby, tell the Fatherland that we fought to the end, fulfilling our duty

(In the style of the epitaph for the soldiers at Thermopylae). The family of Raginis was officially notified of his death in Wizna three years later in 1943 when his sister, Maria Morawska, received a notice through the Red Cross.

Posthumous honors
The local primary school is named after him, as well as several streets in Poland, including one in Białystok, Rzeszów and Warsaw,

The 31st Council of the Polish Scouting Association in Białystok, chose Raginis as their patron in 1969.

On May 13, 1970, Raginis was posthumously awarded, by the Council of State of the Polish People's Republic, with the Virtuti Militari - Gold Cross (IV Class) medal.

On August 28, 2009 he was posthumously awarded, by the President of Poland, with the Order of Polonia Restituta (Grand Cross).

On August 21, 2012 Raginis was posthumously promoted, by the Minister of National Defence Tomasz Siemoniak to the rank of Major.

Cultural references 

The heroic struggle and death of Raginis has inspired a number of films and videos:
 Film documentary titled "Wierność" (1969) written and directed by Grzegorz Królikiewicz.
 Film documentary titled "Dzwony znad Wizny" (1969) directed by Franciszek Burdzy
 Television documentary series episode from TVP titled "Było... nie minęło" first broadcast on September 25, 2010.
 The image of Raginis is included on a stamp in the series "Polish Defense War of 1939" issued by Poczta Polska in 1989 to commemorate the 50th anniversary of the invasion of Poland and the outbreak of World War II.
 The Swedish power metal band Sabaton wrote the song "40:1" about the battle of Wizna, extolling the performance of the Polish defenders. Before their concert in Poland, on October 23, 2008 the members of Sabaton visited Wizna to pay their respects to the soldiers and Raginis.

References

Further reading
 Kosztyła Zygmunt, Obrona odcinka "Wizna" 1939, BKD (Bitwy, Kampanie, Dowódcy) [7/76], 1976
 Kupidura P., Zahor M., Wizna, Wojskowy Przegląd Techniczny i Logistyczny, nr 3, 1999
 Moorhouse Roger, First to Fight: The Polish War, 1939, Bodley Head, 2019 
 Stawiński Kazimierz, Bój pod Wizną. Warszawa 1964. Wydawnictwo Ministerstwa Obrony Narodowej.
 Wiktorzak A., Wizna - Polskie Termopile, Głos Weterana, nr 9, 1997

1908 births
1939 deaths
People from Augšdaugava Municipality
People from Courland Governorate
Polish people of Latvian descent
Polish Army officers
Grand Crosses of the Order of Polonia Restituta
Recipients of the Gold Cross of the Virtuti Militari
Polish military personnel killed in World War II
Military personnel who committed suicide
Suicides by explosive device